Feffer is a surname. Notable people with the surname include:

 David Feffer (born 1956), Brazilian businessman 
 Henry Feffer (1918–2011), American neurosurgeon
 Itzik Feffer (1900–1952), Soviet Yiddish poet
 John Feffer, American author and political analyst
 Leon Feffer (1902–1999), Brazilian businessman